The Hum Honorary Television Award, organized in 2013 for the 1st Hum Awards, was given by the board of directors of the Hum Television Network and Entertainment Channel to the stars of Pakistani television to recognize their lifetime of work and achievements in the television industry. Hum TV overviewed this award with the inception of its first ceremony, this is one of the special awards given by the channel directors for exceptional achievements. All the categorized and organized special awards are given annually during the ceremony.

Honorary Television Award incepted with the origin of first awards. At the first ceremony, ten legendary Pakistan television stars were awarded. The honorary award is presented at the annual Hum Awards ceremony.

Recipients

The following is the listing of the recipients of Hum Honorary Television Award:

Note: The † symbol indicates a posthumous awarded.

References

External links 
Official websites
 Hum Awards official website
Other resources
 

Hum Award winners
Hum Awards